Gregoire is a Canadian drama film, directed by Cody Bown and released in 2017. Shot in Bown's hometown of Fort McMurray, Alberta, the film centres on five directionless young adults struggling to find their place.

The cast includes Morgan Taylor Campbell as Misha, Jared Abrahamson as Felix, Jedidiah Goodacre as Louis, Emily Haine as Alexa, and Ben Cotton as Steve.

The film premiered at the Calgary International Film Festival, where it won the award for Best Canadian Narrative Feature Film, and subsequently screened at the Vancouver International Film Festival.

Bown was nominated for the Directors Guild of Canada's DGC Discovery Award in 2017. The film won two Vancouver Film Critics Circle Awards, for Best Supporting Actor in a Canadian Film (Cotton) and Best Supporting Actress in a Canadian Film (Campbell).

References

External links
 

2017 films
Canadian drama films
English-language Canadian films
Films shot in Alberta
Films set in Alberta
Fort McMurray
2017 drama films
2010s English-language films
2010s Canadian films